The Forum is a completed 35-floor tower in the Business Bay in Dubai, UAE. Construction of The Forum was finished  in 2009.

See also 
 List of buildings in Dubai

External links
Emporis

Skyscraper office buildings in Dubai